Senator Horton may refer to:

Albert H. Horton (1837–1902), Kansas State Senate
Clinton T. Horton (1876–1953), New York State Senate
Frank O. Horton (1882–1948), Wyoming State Senate
Hamilton C. Horton Jr. (1931–2006), North Carolina State Senate
Henry Hollis Horton (1866–1934), Tennessee State Senate
S. Wentworth Horton (1885–1960), New York State Senate
Wilkins P. Horton (1889–1950), North Carolina State Senate